The Fort Smith and Western Railway  was a railroad that operated in the states of Arkansas and Oklahoma.

The railroad's main line extended  from Coal Creek, Oklahoma (about 7 miles east of Bokoshe, Oklahoma) to Guthrie, Oklahoma, with an additional  of trackage rights over the Kansas City Southern Railway between Fort Smith, Arkansas and Coal Creek.  Guthrie was the territorial capital of Oklahoma, and a junction point with the Santa Fe Railway. The Fort Smith and Western owned a subsidiary, St. Louis, El Reno and Western Railway, which began operating  between Guthrie and El Reno, Oklahoma in June 1904.

History
The Fort Smith and Western Railroad was incorporated in Arkansas in 1899 and began construction westward through Indian Territory and Oklahoma Territory.  On November 1, 1903, the railroad was opened between Fort Smith and Guthrie.  The capital of Oklahoma was moved from Guthrie to Oklahoma City in 1910, and in 1915, the FS&W acquired  of trackage rights over the Missouri-Kansas-Texas Railroad from Fallis, Oklahoma to Oklahoma City.

The U.S. District Court in Fort Smith placed the Fort Smith and Western Railroad in receivership on October 9, 1915, on petition by the Superior Savings & Trust Company of Cleveland, Ohio.  The company emerged from receivership as the Fort Smith and Western Railway on February 1, 1923, only to re-enter receivership on June 1, 1931. The Missouri-Kansas-Texas Railroad withdrew trackage rights between Fallis and Oklahoma City in January 1939 after the FS&W defaulted on rental fees, and the FS&W ceased operations on February 9, 1939.

The route of the FS&W served no major population centers, but did serve major coal mining operations in eastern Oklahoma at (from east to west) Coal Creek, Bokoshe, and McCurtain.  Continuing west, other towns served included Crowder, Hanna, Weleetka, Okemah, Boley, Paden, Prague, and Meridian before reaching Guthrie.  A major portion of the road's freight traffic was metallurgical-grade coal from San Bois Coal Company mines near McCurtain.  As coal traffic declined, an oil discovery near Okemah brought additional traffic, which postponed the abandonment of the railroad.

After the FS&W ceased operation, the trackage between Coal Creek and McCurtain was purchased by the Fort Smith and Van Buren Railway, a subsidiary of the Kansas City Southern Railway.

References

Poor's Manual of Railroads - 1919, Poor's Publishing Co., New York, New York.
Drury, George H. (1985) Historical Guide to North American Railroads, Kalmbach Publishing Co., Milwaukee, WI. 
Hull, Clifton E. (1988) Shortline Railroads of Arkansas, UCA Press, Conway, AR. 
Hofsommer, Donovan L. (1982) Railroads of Oklahoma, Oklahoma Historical Society, Oklahoma City, OK.

External links

Fort Smith and Western vs. Mills, 253 U.S. 206 (1920)
Oklahoma legislation permitting railroad construction in Choctaw and Creek Nations. 
 Oklahoma Digital Maps: Digital Collections of Oklahoma and Indian Territory

Defunct Arkansas railroads
Defunct Oklahoma railroads
Former Class I railroads in the United States
Railway companies disestablished in 1939
American companies established in 1899
Railway companies established in 1899
1899 establishments in Arkansas
1939 disestablishments in Arkansas